In Greek mythology, Chrysippus was a divine hero of Elis in the Peloponnesus (Greece), sometimes referred to as Chrysippus of Pisa.

Family 
Chrysippus was the bastard son of Pelops, king of Pisa in the Peloponnesus, and the nymph Axioche or Danais. According to Pseudo-Plutarch, of all his children Pelops loved Chrysippus best.

Mythology 
Chrysippus was kidnapped by the Theban prince Laius, his tutor, who was escorting him to the Nemean Games, where the boy planned to compete. Instead, Laius carried him off to Thebes and raped him, a crime for which he, his city, and his family were later punished by the gods. Others named as Chrysippus' kidnappers Zeus and even Theseus. In one version Chrysippus' father Pelops, following his son's abduction, curses Laius to be killed by one of his own children.

Chrysippus's death was related in various ways.  One author who cites Peisandros as his source claims that he killed himself with his sword out of shame. Hellanicus of Lesbos and Thucydides writes that he was killed out of jealousy by Atreus and Thyestes, his half-brothers, who cast him into a well. This is usually on their mother Hippodamia's suggestion; after Pelops blamed her for Chrysippus' demise, she killed herself or withdrew to Midea in the Argolid.

The death of Chrysippus is sometimes seen as springing from the curse that Myrtilus placed on Pelops for his betrayal, as Pelops threw him from a cliff after he helped Pelops win a race.

Euripides wrote a play called Chrysippus, whose plot covered Chrysippus' death.  The play is now lost.  The play was given in the same trilogy that included The Phoenician Women.

See also 
 Laius
 List of rape victims from history and mythology

References

Bibliography

Ancient sources 
 Sophocles, The Electra of Sophocles. Edited with introduction and notes by Sir Richard Jebb. Sir Richard Jebb. Cambridge. Cambridge University Press. 1894. Cambridge: University Press Warehouse, Ave Maria Lane. Glasgow: 363, Argyle Street. Online version at the Perseus Digital Library.
 Apollodorus, Apollodorus, The Library, with an English Translation by Sir James George Frazer, F.B.A., F.R.S. in 2 Volumes. Cambridge, MA, Harvard University Press; London, William Heinemann Ltd. 1921. Online version at the Perseus Digital Library.
 Hyginus, Gaius Julius, The Myths of Hyginus. Edited and translated by Mary A. Grant, Lawrence: University of Kansas Press, 1960.
 Pausanias, Pausanias Description of Greece with an English Translation by W.H.S. Jones, Litt.D., and H.A. Ormerod, M.A., in 4 Volumes. Cambridge, MA, Harvard University Press; London, William Heinemann Ltd. 1918. Online version at the Perseus Digital Library.
 Plutarch, Moralia. with an English Translation by. Frank Cole Babbitt. Cambridge, MA. Harvard University Press. London. William Heinemann Ltd. 1936. 4. Online version at topos text.

Modern sources

External links 
 CHRYSIPPUS on The Theoi Project

Mythological rape victims
Theban mythology
LGBT themes in Greek mythology
Characters in Greek mythology
Fictional LGBT characters in literature

sv:Krysippos